Baby Doll is a 1956 film written by Tennessee Williams and directed by Elia Kazan.

Baby Doll may also refer to:

People
 Baby Doll (singer), stage name of Serbian performer and Eurovision contestant Dragana Saric
 Baby Doll (wrestler) (born 1962), stage name of professional wrestler Nickla Roberts
 Baby Doll, stage name of Indian model / performer Deepal Shaw
 Baby Doll, another name for Pussycat Doll Melody Thornton
 Malaysia Babydoll Foxx, American drag queen

Film and television
 Baby Doll (1916 film), starring Oliver Hardy
 "Baby Doll", 1956 American film
 La bambolona, a 1967 Italian film
 "Baby-Doll" (Batman: The Animated Series), a television episode
 Baby Doll, an episode of the American situation comedy television series Charles in Charge
 Baby-Doll, a character portrayed by fictional actress Mary Dahl in that episode 
 "Baby Doll", a 2002 science fiction short story by Johanna Sinisalo
 Babydoll, the protagonist of the 2011 film Sucker Punch

Music

Albums
Babydoll (album), an album by Alisha Chinai

Songs
 "Baby Doll" (Girlicious song)
 "Baby Doll" (Top Cats song), 2012
 "Baby Doll" (Kanika Kapoor song), 2014
 "Baby Doll" (Pat Green song), 2004
 "Baby Doll", a song from the 1952 film The Belle of New York
 "Baby Doll", a song by Cat Power from her 2003 album You Are Free
 "Baby Doll", a song by Devo from their 1988 album Total Devo
 "Babydoll", a song by The Fratellis from their 2008 album Here We Stand
 "Babydoll", a song by Hole from their 1991 album Pretty on the Inside
 "Babydoll", a song by Laurie Anderson from her 1989 album Strange Angels
 "Babydoll", a song by Mariah Carey from her 1997 album Butterfly
 "Baby Doll", a song by N*E*R*D from their 2001 album In Search of...
 "Baby Doll", a song by Penny McLean from her 1975 album Lady Bump
 "Baby Doll", a song by Tony! Toni! Toné! from their 1988 album Who?

Other uses
 Babydoll, a style of nightgown popularized by the 1956 film
 Baby doll, a child's toy doll representing a child, especially an infant
 Baby Doll, a perfume made by Yves Saint Laurent
 Babydoll, a trend in modelling inspired by the babydoll-like look of supermodel Gemma Ward
 Babydoll, a diminutive variety of the Southdown breed of sheep